The Communications Act 2003  is an Act of the Parliament of the United Kingdom. The act, which came into force on 25 July 2003, superseded the Telecommunications Act 1984. The new act was the responsibility of Culture Secretary Tessa Jowell. It consolidated the telecommunication and broadcasting regulators in the UK, introducing the Office of Communications (Ofcom) as the new industry regulator. On 28 December 2003 Ofcom gained its full regulatory powers, inheriting the duties of the Office of Telecommunications (Oftel). Among other measures, the act introduced legal recognition of community radio and paved the way for full-time community radio services in the UK, as well as controversially lifting many restrictions on cross-media ownership. It also made it illegal to use other people's Wi-Fi broadband connections without their permission. In addition, the legislation also allowed for the first time non-European entities to wholly own a British television company.

Provisions of the act 
The act had a large number of provisions, including the following:

 Dishonestly obtaining access to the Internet with no intention to pay for the service was made a criminal offence.
 Sending a malicious communication using social media was made a criminal offence. 
 The Independent Television Commission, Radio Authority, Office of Telecommunications, and Radiocommunications Agency were merged into Ofcom.
 The telecommunications licensing regime was replaced by a general authorisation for companies to provide telecommunications services subject to general conditions of entitlement, while BT retained its universal service obligation.
 It was declared an offence to "persistently make use of a public electronic communications network for the purpose of causing annoyance, inconvenience or needless anxiety". Ofcom subsequently developed policies to reduce the number of silent telephone calls.
 The public service remit for Channel 4 was revised.
 Broadcasters were required to make a proportion of television programmes outside the London area (defined as outside the M25).
 Restrictions on ITV company ownership were lifted, aside from "public interest" test that was added as an amendment in the House of Lords. The result was the formation of a single entity ITV plc controlling all of the ITV franchises in England and Wales in February 2004.
 The limit on the proportion of ITN that any ITV operating company could own was abolished.
 Broadcasters were required to carry a "suitable quantity and range of programmes" dealing with religion and other beliefs, as part of their public service broadcasting.
 Political advertising on television or radio was prohibited.
Ofcom given the responsibility to 'promote' media literacy.
 The Gaelic Media Service (now MG ALBA) was created "to secure that a wide and diverse range of high quality programmes in Gaelic are broadcast or otherwise transmitted so as to be available to persons in Scotland".
 Community radio stations were recognised as a distinct third tier of radio alongside BBC Radio and commercial radio.
 The authority for the BBC to collect the licence fee was set out.
 Provision was made for the requirements for blind and deaf television viewers. This has subsequently included sign language, subtitles and audio description.
 The Broadcast Committee of Advertising Practice was established as the regulatory body ensuring that advertising on radio and television is not misleading, harmful, offensive, or beyond the boundaries of taste and decency.

Wi-Fi 

It is an offence under section 125 of the act to obtain access to the Internet when there is no intention to pay for that service. The legislation was intended to prevent the major defrauding of communications companies. Nevertheless, the individual practice of piggybacking (the illicit use of a Wi-Fi connection to access another subscriber's Internet service) was demonstrated to be a contravention of the act by R v Straszkiewicz in 2005. There have been subsequent arrests for the practice. Piggybacking may also be a breach of the Computer Misuse Act 1990. Section 125 of the act has been criticised for its vagueness, resulting in the possibility that many users of portable Wi-Fi enabled devices are inadvertently breaching it.

Malicious communications 

Section 127 of the act makes it an offence to send a message that is grossly offensive or of an indecent, obscene or menacing character over a public electronic communications network. The section replaced section 43 of the Telecommunications Act 1984 and is drafted as widely as its predecessor. The section has been used controversially to prosecute users of social media in cases such as the Twitter Joke Trial and Facebook comments concerning the murder of April Jones.

On 19 December 2012, to strike a balance between freedom of speech and criminality, the Director of Public Prosecutions issued interim guidelines, clarifying when social messaging is eligible for criminal prosecution under UK law. Only communications that are credible threats of violence, harassment, or stalking (such as aggressive Internet trolling) which specifically targets an individual or individuals, or breaches a court order designed to protect someone (such as those protecting the identity of a victim of a sexual offence) will be prosecuted. Communications that express an "unpopular or unfashionable opinion about serious or trivial matters, or banter or humour, even if distasteful to some and painful to those subjected to it" will not. Communications that are merely "grossly offensive, indecent, obscene or false" will be prosecuted only when it can be shown to be necessary and proportionate. People who pass on malicious messages, such as by retweeting, can also be prosecuted when the original message is subject to prosecution. Individuals who post messages as part of a separate crime, such as a plan to import drugs, would face prosecution for that offence, as is currently the case.

Revisions to the interim guidelines were issued on 20 June 2013 following a public consultation. The revisions specified that prosecutors should consider:
 whether messages were aggravated by references to race, religion or other minorities, and whether they breached existing rules to counter harassment or stalking; and
 the age and maturity of any wrongdoer should be taken into account and given great weight.
The revisions also clarified that criminal prosecutions were "unlikely": 
 when the author of the message had "expressed genuine remorse";
 when "swift and effective action ... to remove the communication" was taken; or
 when messages were not intended for a wide audience.

Amendments to the act 
Regulations amended the act in 2009 and 2010, making Ofcom the co-regulator for video on demand in the UK, along with ATVOD and the Advertising Standards Authority.
 The Digital Economy Act 2010 amended the Communications Act 2003, giving Ofcom the responsibility of enforcing regulations concerning Internet copyright breaches.
 The Postal Services Act 2011 allowed Ofcom to take over regulatory responsibility for the Royal Mail from the Postal Services Commission.
 The Audiovisual Media Services Regulations 2014 amended the Communications Act 2003 to set out statutory and legal obligations for media distributors of on-demand content. The regulations define the content that can legally be distributed under an R18 certificate and make it a criminal offence to not adequately restrict access to such content to those aged over 18.

Notable prosecutions
 2012: Paul Chambers made a joke on Twitter in response to Robin Hood Airport cancelling flights. He said that unless the facility resolved the problem within a week, he would be "blowing the airport sky high". After an off-duty manager discovered the post, Chambers was arrested by anti-terror police. He was found guilty, lost his job and was ordered to pay a £385 fine and £600 in costs. However, after a strong public outcry and three appeals, the case was eventually overturned.
2014: A Lincolnshire man was charged with being grossly offensive after posting a photograph of a policeman on social media, with two phalluses drawn on it. The offending picture was passed on to Lincolnshire Police, who arrested the 20-year-old. He was ordered to pay £400 in compensation to the officer in question, in addition to £85 costs and a £60 victim surcharge.
 2017: R v Mwaikambo where a 43-year-old man posted one video and seven pictures of a victim of the Grenfell Towers tragedy to his Facebook account. Notable in this case was the rapidity of conviction: the fire occurred on 14 June and the case was heard but two days later. Mwaikambo was imprisoned by Ikram J for a total of three months.
 2018: Mark Meechan, a comedian and social commentator, was convicted under the Communications Act in 2018. He had made a video demonstrating how he had trained his girlfriend's dog to perform a Nazi salute upon hearing the phrase "Sieg Heil" and to respond to being asked if he wanted to "gas the Jews". Even though Meechan said that he was not actually racist and that it was a joke intended to annoy his girlfriend, the court found him guilty of being "grossly offensive" on 20 March. He was fined £800 at Airdrie Sheriff Court on 23 April 2018.
 2018: A Merseyside woman was convicted under the Communications Act for posting rap lyrics on Instagram which were deemed 'racist', due to them including racially charged language. Chelsea Russell had used lyrics from a Snap Dogg song as a tribute to a boy who died in a road accident. She was sentenced to an eight-week community order, along with an eight-week curfew. She was also ordered to pay costs of £500 and an £85 victim surcharge. Her conviction was quashed on appeal in February 2019.
 2020: Kate Scottow was convicted in February 2020 for tweeting transphobic insults.  This conviction was quashed on appeal in December 2020.
 2020: Conservative Party candidate Joshua Spencer was sentenced to 9-weeks imprisonment under section 127 for threatening messages towards Yvette Cooper and her constituency staff.

See also
 UK public service law
 Telecommunications Act 1997, Australia
 Telecommunications Act (Canada)
 Telecommunications Act of 1996, United States

Notes

External links 
Practical Law Company's 'Telecoms: a quick guide'

United Kingdom Acts of Parliament 2003
Public services
United Kingdom public law
Communications in the United Kingdom
Broadcasting in the United Kingdom
History of telecommunications in the United Kingdom
Internet censorship in the United Kingdom
Political funding in the United Kingdom